Tasuj Rural District may refer to:
 Tasuj Rural District (Dashti County)
 Tasuj Rural District (Fars Province)